Feldzeugmeister was a historical military rank in some German and the Austro-Hungarian armies, especially in use for the artillery. It was commonly used in the 16th or 17th century, but could even be found at the beginning of the 20th century in some European countries. In the army of Habsburg Empire, the rank of Feldzeugmeister was an equivalent of lieutenant general.

Etymology
The  German term  Feldzeugmeister literally translates as "ordnance master" or "gun master". (Feld- means battlefield, as used in the German title for field marshal (Feldmarschall), and -zeug- refers to the guns used by the artillery.)

Military rank
Originally, the ranks above Feldzeugmeister were Feldhauptmann and Feldmarschall. The third most important person in the army was the Feldzeugmeister. Although the expression was common in the German artillery, Austrian, Hungarian and French militias used the title as well. The position of a Feldzeugmeister differed by German states. In Austria-Hungary, the Feldzeugmeister was one of three separate general of the branch ranks.

In 1898, the Ministry of War of the Kingdom of Prussia created the position of a Feldzeugmeister which was comparable to the commander of a division. The Feldzeugmeister was in charge of delivering weapons, ammunition and personnel.

In Bavaria of 1906, the inspection of weapons was organised by the department of the Feldzeugmeister.

Austro-Hungarian Army

In the Austrian and Hungarian service, Feldzeugmeister (in Hungarian Táborszernagy) had a different meaning. During the Napoleonic Wars, the Feldzeugmeister held the rank just above Feldmarschallleutnant and just below Feldmarschall (field marshal). It was a roughly equivalent rank to full general. Feldzeugmeister was equal to general of the infantry (General der Infanterie) and general of the cavalry (General der Kavallerie). It remained the second highest rank of the Austrian army until the creation of colonel-general (Generaloberst) in 1915.
Originally members of the infantry and artillery were given this rank, while members of the cavalry would become generals of the cavalry. From 1908 onwards the rank Feldzeugmeister was given to members of the artillery only.

See also
 Reichszeugmeisterei
 Master-General of the Ordnance

References

External links
 List of Austrian Generals
 Austrian Generals 1792-1815

Military ranks of Austria